The Ambassadors is a 1533 painting by Hans Holbein the Younger. Also known as Jean de Dinteville and Georges de Selve, after the two people it portrays, it was created in the Tudor period, in the same year Elizabeth I was born. Franny Moyle speculates that Elizabeth's mother, Anne Boleyn, then Queen of England, might have commissioned the painting as a gift for Jean de Dinteville, the ambassador portrayed on the left in the painting. As well as being a double portrait, the painting contains a still life of several meticulously rendered objects, the meaning of which is the cause of much debate. It also incorporates one of the best-known examples of anamorphosis in painting. The Ambassadors has been part of London's National Gallery collection since its purchase in 1890.

Description
Although he was a German-born artist who spent much of his time in England, Holbein here displays the influence of Early Netherlandish painting. He used oils which for panel paintings had been developed a century before in Early Netherlandish painting, and just as Jan van Eyck and the Master of Flémalle used extensive imagery to link their subjects to religious concepts, Holbein used symbolic objects around the figures to suggest mostly secular ideas and interests.

Among the clues to the figures' associations are a selection of scientific instruments including two globes (one terrestrial and one celestial), a shepherd's dial, a quadrant, a torquetum, and a polyhedral sundial, as well as various textiles including the floor mosaic, based on a design from Westminster Abbey (the Cosmati pavement, before the High Altar), and the carpet on the upper shelf, an example of Oriental carpets in Renaissance painting. The figure on the left is in secular attire while the figure on the right is dressed in clerical clothes. They flank the table, which displays open books and symbols of religious knowledge, including a symbolic link to the Virgin.  Near the top left corner, a crucifix can be seen, partially covered by the curtain.

In contrast, other scholars have suggested the painting contains overtones of religious strife. The conflicts between secular and religious authorities are here represented by Jean de Dinteville, a landowner, and Georges de Selve, the Bishop of Lavaur. The commonly accepted symbol of discord, a lute with a broken string, is included next to a hymnbook in  Martin Luther's translation, suggesting strife between scholars and the clergy. For others, if the lute's broken string suggests the interruption of religious harmony, the Lutheran hymnal, open on facing pages reproducing a song on the Commandments (Law) and one on the Holy Spirit (Grace) may suggest their being in "harmony" with each other.

The terrestrial globe on the lower shelf repeats a portion of a cartographically imaginative map created in possibly 1530 and of unknown origin.  The map is referred to as the Ambassadors' Globe due to its popularly known appearance in the painting.

The work has been described as "one of the most staggeringly impressive portraits in Renaissance art."

Anamorphic skull

The most notable and famous of Holbein's symbols in the work is the distorted skull which is placed in the bottom centre of the composition. The skull, rendered in anamorphic perspective, another invention of the Early Renaissance, is meant to be a visual puzzle as the viewer must approach the painting from high on the right side, or low on the left side, to see the form as an accurate rendering of a human skull. While the skull is evidently intended as a vanitas or memento mori, it is unclear why Holbein gave it such prominence in this painting. A simple explanation is that "memento mori" was de Dinteville's motto, while another possibility is that this painting represents three levels: the heavens as portrayed by the astrolabe and other objects on the upper shelf, the living world as evidenced by books and a musical instrument on the lower shelf, and death signified by the skull.

It has also been hypothesized that the painting was meant to hang beside a doorway, or even in a stairwell, so that persons entering the room or walking up the stairs and passing the painting on their left would be confronted by the appearance of the skull. A further possibility is that Holbein simply wished to show off his ability with the technique in order to secure future commissions. However, artists often incorporated skulls as a reminder of mortality. Holbein may have intended the skulls (one as a gray slash and the other as a medallion on Jean de Dinteville's hat) and the crucifix in the upper left corner to encourage contemplation of one's impending death and the resurrection.

Identity of the subjects
Before the publication of Mary F. S. Hervey's Holbein's Ambassadors: The Picture and the Men in 1900, the identity of the two figures in the picture had long been a subject of intense debate. In 1890, Sidney Colvin was the first to propose the figure on the left as Jean de Dinteville, Seigneur of Polisy (1504–1555), French ambassador to the court of Henry VIII for most of 1533. Shortly afterwards, the cleaning of the picture revealed that his seat of Polisy is one of only four French places marked on the globe.  Hervey identified the man on the right as Georges de Selve (1508/09–1541), Bishop of Lavaur, after tracing the painting's history back to a seventeenth-century manuscript. According to art historian John Rowlands, de Selve is not wearing episcopal robes because he was not consecrated until 1534. De Selve is known from two of de Dinteville's letters to his brother François de Dinteville, Bishop of Auxerre, to have visited London in the spring of 1533. On 23 May, Jean de Dinteville wrote: "Monsieur de Lavaur did me the honour of coming to see me, which was no small pleasure to me. There is no need for the grand maître to hear anything of it". The grand maître in question was Anne de Montmorency, the Marshal of France, a reference that has led some analysts to conclude that de Selve's mission was a secret one; but there is no other evidence to corroborate the theory. On June 4, the ambassador wrote to his brother again, saying: "Monsieur de Lavaur came to see me, but has gone away again".

Hervey's identification of the sitters has remained the standard one, affirmed in extended studies of the painting by Foister, Roy, and Wyld (1997), Zwingenberger (1999), and North (2004), who concludes that "the general coherence of the evidence assembled by Hervey is very satisfying"; however, North also notes that, despite Hervey's research, "Rival speculation did not stop at once and is still not entirely dead". Giles Hudson, for example, has argued that the man on the right is not de Selve, but Jean's brother François, Bishop of Auxerre, a noted patron of the arts with a known interest in mathematical instruments. The identification finds support in the earliest manuscript in which the painting is mentioned, a 1589 inventory of the Chateau of Polisy, discovered by Riccardo Famiglietti. However, scholars have argued that this identification of 1589 was incorrect. John North, for example, remarks that "This was a natural enough supposition to be made by a person with limited local knowledge, since the two brothers lived on the family estates together at the end of their lives, but it is almost certainly mistaken". He points to a letter François de Dinteville wrote to Jean on 28 March 1533, in which he talks of an imminent meeting with the Pope and makes no mention of visiting London. Unlike the man on the right of the picture, François was older than Jean de Dinteville. The inscription on the man on the right's book is "AETAT/IS SV Æ 25" (his age is 25); that on de Dinteville's dagger is "AET. SV Æ/ 29" (he is 29).

North's book analyzes the painting and shows it to be representing Good Friday through various clues on the instruments.

See also 

 Artists of the Tudor court
 List of paintings by Hans Holbein the Younger

References

Citations

Sources 
 
 

 
 
 Hart, Vaughan (1999). ‘Hans Holbein’s “The Ambassadors” (1533): A Computer View of Renaissance Perspective Illusion’, Computers and the History of Art, Harwood Academic Publishers, vol.8 no.2, pp. 1–13.

External links

Google Art Project HQ scan of the painting
The Ambassadors, Zoomable and Annotated, with many details
Video proposing an explanation as to how the anamorphic projection was made
The National Gallery article on the painting
Essay on the meaning of the painting
ArtSleuth : The Ambassadors, Rendezvous with Death

Collections of the National Gallery, London
Portraits by Hans Holbein the Younger
1533 paintings
Paintings about death
Musical instruments in art
Books in art
Maps in art
Skulls in art